Richard Paul "Rooster" Burleson (born April 29, 1951) is an American former Major League Baseball shortstop. Burleson, who played for three American League teams over 13 seasons, was a very intense ballplayer. Former Boston Red Sox teammate Bill Lee once said of Burleson, "Some guys didn't like to lose, but Rick got angry if the score was even tied."

Minor leagues
Burleson was originally drafted by the Minnesota Twins in the 1970 Major League Baseball Draft upon graduation from Warren High School, but did not sign. After a year at Cerritos Junior College, the Boston Red Sox selected Burleson #5 overall during the January secondary phase of the 1970 Major League Baseball Draft.

Burleson spent his first professional season with the Winter Haven Red Sox of the Florida State League. He batted only .220, and committed 38 errors at short. In , Burleson was named an Eastern League All-Star while assigned to the Pawtucket Red Sox. Following Luis Aparicio's retirement, he battled Mario Guerrero for the starting shortstop job in spring training .

Boston Red Sox
Though Guerrero won the job, Burleson still managed to earn a call to the major leagues by May. On May 4, Burleson tied a major league record by committing three errors in his major league debut, and was replaced by Guerrero at short by the end of the game.

Burleson was batting .298 with one home run, 28 runs batted in and 45 runs scored to be elected the starting American League shortstop at the 1977 Major League Baseball All-Star Game. For the season, Burleson batted .293 with three home runs, 52 RBIs and 80 runs scored, and was second to Jim Rice among team hit leaders with 194 base hits.

In 1979, Burleson batted .278, scored 90 runs and earned the AL's Gold Glove Award at short to earn his first of two consecutive Thomas A. Yawkey Awards as the Most Valuable Player of the Boston Red Sox. He batted .278 with a career high eight home runs and 89 runs scored, and set a major league record for double plays by a shortstop in a single season with 147 en route to winning the award the following season.

California Angels
Burleson was traded along with Butch Hobson from the Red Sox to the Angels for Carney Lansford, Rick Miller and Mark Clear on December 10, 1980. His first season with the Angels, he batted .293 with 33 RBIs and 53 runs scored while playing 109 of the Angels' 110 games during the strike shortened season. He won the Silver Slugger Award as the best hitting shortstop in the American League and the Gene Autry Award as the MVP of the California Angels.

A year later he injured his throwing arm, appearing in only 51 games over the next three seasons, and missing the entire  season. Along with backing up Dick Schofield at short, he appeared in 38 games as a designated hitter, and played second and third base for the first time since his rookie season.

Following the season, he signed as a free agent with the Baltimore Orioles. He batted .209 in 55 games as a second baseman for the Orioles in  before he was released during the All-Star break.

Coaching and managerial career

In , he replaced Pat Kelly as manager of the GCL Reds, after Kelly was named bench coach by the Cincinnati Reds.

In , Burleson switched to the Arizona Diamondbacks system and worked as a coach for the Visalia Oaks. From 2009 to 2012, Burleson served as hitting coach and first base coach for the Reno Aces of the Pacific Coast League, the triple-A affiliate of the Arizona Diamondbacks.

Private life
Burleson is the father of three sons, Tyler, Chad and Kyle, and a daughter, Lauren.

See also

List of AL Silver Slugger Winners at Shortstop
List of Boston Red Sox awards

References

The ESPN Baseball Encyclopedia – Gary Gillette, Peter Gammons, Pete Palmer. Publisher: Sterling Publishing, 2005. Format: Paperback, 1824pp. Language: English.

External links

Rick Burleson at Baseball Almanac
Rick Burleson Baseball

1951 births
Living people
Águilas del Zulia players
American expatriate baseball players in Venezuela
American expatriate baseball players in Canada
American League All-Stars
Baltimore Orioles players
Baseball coaches from California
Baseball players from California
Billings Mustangs managers
Boston Red Sox coaches
Boston Red Sox players
California Angels coaches
California Angels players
Edmonton Trappers players
Gold Glove Award winners
Greenville Red Sox players
Louisville Bats managers
Major League Baseball shortstops
Major League Baseball third base coaches
Oakland Athletics coaches
Pawtucket Red Sox players
People from Greater Los Angeles
San Antonio Missions managers
Silver Slugger Award winners
Winston-Salem Red Sox players
Winter Haven Red Sox players